Gndevank (meaning Round cathedral) is a 10th-century Armenian monastery in the Vayots Dzor Province of Armenia, along the Vayk-Jermuk road.

Location
The monastery is located on the west side of the Vayk-Jermuk road on the bank of the Arpa river. There is a spring water in the vicinity of the church and a few picnic tables.

History
The monastery was built in 936 AD by Princess Sophia of Syunik. She stated the purpose of her building the monastery as: "Vayots Dzor was a ring without a jewel but I built this monastery as the jewel for the ring". Priest Sargis was the first abbot of the church. Priest Yeghishe was entrusted the responsibility for its construction. In 999 AD it was expanded with a gavit, a narthex  or entrance to the church. In subsequent years the monastery was fortified with walls around it, under the orders of Abbot Petros (Peter).

The monastery, which was damaged during an earthquake, was refurbished during 1965 and 1969. Further renovations were done during 2013. In 1875, several items of religious paraphernalia were found in a secret chamber in the church.

Features
The church, well preserved, is dedicated to St. Stephen. It is built in the form of a cross-dome of four apses, with a circular tambour (inverted bell of the Corinthian capital) over a cupola. There are four altars in the church. The gavit, added in the western part of the church in subsequent years, is in the shape of barrel; it is vaulted and appears like a tunnel approach to the church. Abbot Christopher built the vaulted hall with two chambers. Sargis, who succeeded him, ordered the construction of a canal from the Vararakn River for providing a water supply to the church, which is still functional. On the southern and western side of the compound wall, monks' living quarters have been built.

Of the surviving wall paintings, one by Yeghishe of Jesus Christ is on the altar wall. Another notable painting in the church is of Mother Mary on the northern annexed wall, which is said to be a masterpiece of the late Middle Ages in Armenia. The surfaces of the pendentives have carved images of the evangelists. The tombstones surrounding the church have carvings of interest, such as a scene of ibex hunting next to a falcon, and the hunting of a boar. Khachkars (cross stones) are also seen here.

Gallery

References

Bibliography

External links 
 Armeniapedia.org: Gndevank
 A Flickr photo of Gndevank
 About Gndevank

Christian monasteries in Armenia
Buildings and structures in Vayots Dzor Province
Tourist attractions in Vayots Dzor Province